Grupo Firme is a Regional Mexican band based in Tijuana, Baja California, founded in 2014. They have received nominations for a variety of awards that include Premios Juventud and Premio Lo Nuestro, being the winner in 2021 of the latter in five categories.

History
Grupo Firme was founded in 2014 in the city of Tijuana by Eduin Cazares and Jairo Corrales. In 2017, they released their debut album Pasado, Presente, Futuro with a total of twelve songs.  It was not very successful, but it got them noticed by the music scene. From there, they released other albums such as El Barco and En Vivo desde Tijuana: Los Buitrones y Los Firmes; the latter in collaboration with Los Buitres de Culiacán.

The group rose to fame in 2020 by releasing the singles Pídeme, El Roto and Juro Por Dios. Later that year, they toured Colombia, in addition to recording a live album there entitled En Vivo desde Medellín, Colombia. In 2020, they were nominated for the Premios Juventud. In 2021, they won four Premios Juventud, they also won five of six nominations at Premio Lo Nuestro. On November 18, they won their first Latin Grammy for Best Banda Album for their album Nos Divertimos Lo Grando Lo Imposible. The group's success continued in 2022 as they embarked on a stadium tour throughout the United States and Mexico called Enfiestados y Amanecidos which began at SoFi Stadium in Inglewood, California.

Awards and nominations

References

Mexican norteño musical groups
Musical groups established in 2014
2014 establishments in Mexico
Latin Grammy Award winners
Musical groups from Tijuana